Muzhappilangad Drive-in Beach (3.8 Kms length) is a beach on the Malabar Coast in the state of Kerala in southwestern India. It is considered as the longest drive-in beach in Asia and is featured among the top 6 best beaches for driving in the world in BBC article for Autos.

Overview

The Muzhapiilangad beach is located parallel to National Highway 66 (formerly National Highway 17) between Kannur and Thalassery. 

The beach festival is celebrated in the month of April and it is one of the important tourist attraction in the district of Kannur in Kerala. The youth also try many driving stunts in cars like drifting and wheeling in bikes as this is a paradise for driving along the shore.

There is an unpaved road winding through coconut groves leading to the beach. To get to this road, if you are driving from Tellicherry towards Kannur, take the left turn just before the railway over bridge (first railway crossing) you encounter after crossing the Moidu bridge. The beach is about 3.8 kms long and curves in a wide area providing a good view of Kannur on the north. Local laws allow beachgoers to drive for a full 3.4 kms directly on the sands of the beach. The beach is bordered by black rocks, which also protect it from the stronger currents of the ocean. These rocks provide habitat for Blue mussel, a delicious seafood. Beach attracts bird-watchers from far off places as hundreds of birds flock here during various seasons.

Approximately 100–200 m south of the beach there is a private island called Dharmadam Island (Pacha Thuruthu in Malayalam, which translates to Green Island in English).  It is possible to walk to the island during low tide from the nearby Dharmadam beach.

Tourism
Since the late 1990s, the beach has seen a steady influx of European tourists during winter. A major share of foreign and domestic tourists are not aware of the potential of this elusive destination. It is a must see destination for Indians as well as foreign tourists. After the face lift of the beach there has been a huge improvement in the facilities available to the beach visitors including resorts, roads, etc. The beach is wide and the sand is firm enough to support smooth driving.

Bird watching hotspot

Despite a tourist destination the beach is a bird watching hotspot too. More than thirty species of migratory birds visit here in the winter. Among them Pectoral sandpiper and Caspian plover, sighted here in 2013 were reported for the first time in Kerala. Long, broad shore and rocky formations on the either side of the beach provide a safe place for migration.

Species
Source:

 Asian Openbill
 Black kite
 Black-winged Stilt
 Brahminy kite
 Common Greenshank
 Common Redshank
 Egrets
 Eurasian Curlew
 Eurasian Oystercatcher
 Eurasian whimbrel
 Gulls
 Little Stint
 Plovers
 Ruddy Turnstone
 Ruff
 Sanderling
 Sandpipers
 Terns
 White bellied sea eagle

Accessibility
Nearest airports:

 Kannur International Airport: 
 Karipur International Airport: 

Nearest towns/railway stations:

 Edakkad Railway Station: 
 Thalassery: 
 Kannur: 
 Mangalore railway station: 

By road:

On National Highway 66 the beach is situated between Kannur town and Thalassery town. There are five village connection roads from the National Highway towards the beach.

Image gallery

See also
 Bekal beach
 Kappad beach
 Kozhikode Beach
 Muzhappilangad
 Thalassery
 Dharmadam
 Dharmadam Island
 Kannur

References

External links

 Riding on Muzhappilangad drive in beach—YouTube video

Beaches of Kerala
Tourist attractions in Kannur district
Thalassery road, Kannur